The Idrisid Emirate of Asir was a state located in the Arabian Peninsula. The Emirate was located in the geographical region of Asir and Jizan in what is now southwestern Saudi Arabia, and extending to Hodeidah, northwest of Yemen.

History 

In the early 20th century the Asir region was in chaos. De jure, the region was governed as the Sanjak of Asir which was part of the Vilayet of Yemen, although the Ottomans only had de facto control over port cities, while the hinterlands were ruled by various tribal chiefs. Even in the areas of Ottoman control, anti-Turkish sentiment was brewing, beginning ethnic and sectarian conflicts between the Turkish overlords and the local inhabitants. Due to these circumstances, Sayyid Muhammad ibn Ali al-Idrisi began spreading his grandfather's teachings, as well as calling for the local inhabitants to maintain a stricter adherence to Islam. On December 24, 1908, Muhammad proclaimed himself Imam, after which many tribes in the Asir region recognized him as their spiritual leader.

Throughout the autumn of 1909, Muhammad began his first efforts towards subverting Ottoman power in the region. Following this, Idrisid troops took over Az Zaydiyah and Al Luḩayyah, together with several tribes of Upper Asir aligning themselves with Al-Idrisi, led to the decision where the Ottomans made peace with the Idrisids. In the treaty of al-Hafa'ir (ratified January 1910), Al-Idrisi gained the position of Kaymakam of Asir which de facto made him a semi-independent ruler of the region under Ottoman Suzerainty.

In October 1910, a debate in the court over Sharia law reignited Al-Idrisi's rebellion with renewed strength. The renewed conflict saw military engagements at Abha, Al Luḩayyah, Midi and other locations. The Italo-Turkish War led to Italy assisting Asir by means of naval bombardment, arms and ammunition, the two states united against a common enemy. The outbreak of World War I led the Ottomans to seek a truce, which came into effect on 3 August 1914.

By 1915, with the first world war in full swing, Al Idrisi established contacts with the British through its administration in Aden. With the new connections, the Idrisids occupied over the Farasan Islands, and later parts of Northern Tihamah and Al Luḩayyah. As the Arab Revolt spread across Arabia, Muhammad proclaimed himself the Emir of an independent Emirate of Asir on August 3, 1917. The British soon recognized his move, with the intention of using him to assist in the fight against Yemen.

Threats to Asir's independence would soon grow, as Hussein bin Ali of Hejaz and Yahya of Yemen would eye territory controlled by the Emirate. Due to these circumstances, Al-Idrisi secured an alliance with Ibn Saud of Nejd in order for the latter to act as a bulwark against Hejaz and Yemen. Yet despite the aforementioned agreement, Al-Idrisi would also use Hejazi support in order to occupy parts of Yemeni Tihamah throughout 1919 to 1921, thus stretching the Emirate's territory from Abha in the North to Al Hudaydah in the South.

After the death of Muhammad ibn Ali Al-Idrisi in lower Asir, a feud flared up between his son, Sayyid Ali ibn Muhammad al-idrisi al-Hasani and his brother, Sayyid al-Hasan ibn Ali al-Idrisi al-Hasani. The title of Emir was eventually passed on to the former, yet he could barely exercise his power due to his young age and a lack of authority from his father. In early 1926 the Emir Ali was overthrown by his uncle Al-Hassan, who saw himself as a better fit for the throne.

As the new Emir came to power, the rulers of Hejaz and Yemen claimed Idrisid possessions. In April 1925 Imam Yahya took over Al Hudaydah and occupied other parts of the Idrisid Emirate. Due to the fear of his realm being annexed, especially by Yemen, the Emir signed a deal with Ibn Saud on a protectorate treaty on October 21, 1926 – in which the foreign policy would be handled by the Saudis while the Emir retained his power over domestic affairs. By that time the Emirate was losing its southern territories to Yemen.

Nonetheless, Emir Al-Hasan sought the restoration of his previously independent authority with the limiting of the protectorate treaty. This led him to contact the Imam of Yemen, being dissatisfied with Saudi overlordship. King ibn Saud responded with carrying out the full annexation of the Emirate in 1934 (in accordance with the Treaty of Taif) and following that the King proclaimed the full unification of Saudi Arabia.

Monarchs

Emir of Asir 
 Sayyid Muhammad ibn Ali al-Idrisi (1909–1923)
 Sayyid Ali ibn Muhammad al-Idrisi al-Hasani (1923–1926)
 Sayyid al-Hasan ibn Ali al-Idrisi al-Hasani (1926–1930)

References

External links 

R.L. Headley, ʿAsīr, Encyclopaedia of Islam, Second Edition.
A. K. Bang, The Idrisi State of Asir 1906–1934: Politics, Religion and Personal Prestige as State-building factors in early twentieth century Arabia, Bergen Studies on the Middle East and Africa (1996).
J. Reissner, Die Idrīsīden in ʿAsīr. Ein historischer Überblick, in: Die Welt des Islams, New Series, Bd. 21, Nr. 1/4 (1981), pp. 164–192. At JSTOR.
I. Ghanem, The Legal History of 'A Sir (Al-Mikhlaf Al-Sulaymani), Arab Law Quarterly, Vol. 5, No. 3 (Aug., 1990), pp. 211–214. At JSTOR.

Former Arab states
Former monarchies of Asia
Ottoman Arabia
Former emirates
Successor states
'Asir Province